Valley Farm Ruins is the remaining structures of an historic estate on the banks of Elkhorn Creek in Franklin County, Kentucky near the Woodford County line. The property was added to the United States National Register of Historic Places on July 24, 1975.

References

National Register of Historic Places in Franklin County, Kentucky
Farms on the National Register of Historic Places in Kentucky
1784 establishments in Virginia
Ruins in the United States
Federal architecture in Kentucky
Pre-statehood history of Kentucky